India competed at the 2002 Winter Olympics in Salt Lake City, United States. India's sole competitor was Shiva Keshavan in the Men's Luge, who placed 33rd overall.

Luge

Men

References
Official Olympic Reports
Olympics-Reference.com

Nations at the 2002 Winter Olympics
2002 Winter Olympics
2002 in Indian sport